Josip Stjepan Garić (October 28, 1870 – June 30, 1946) was Bosnian Franciscan friar of the Franciscan Province of Bosna Srebrena, and bishop of Banja Luka.

Biography 
Garić was born at Vitez, town in Central Bosnia. In  1886 he entered in Franciscan monastery in Fojnica and he became Franciscan friar. He was ordained a priest on July 30, 1893.

References 

1870 births
1946 deaths
People from Vitez
Croats of Bosnia and Herzegovina
Franciscans of the Franciscan Province of Bosnia
Bishops of Banja Luka
Franciscan bishops
Bishops appointed by Pope Pius X
Bosnia and Herzegovina Roman Catholic bishops
Roman Catholic bishops in Yugoslavia